Stephen Crow (also known as Stephen J. Crow, Steve Crow, and Steve J. Crow) is a game programmer who worked in the 1980s on the ZX Spectrum platform, programming for companies such as Hewson Consultants and Bubble Bus Software. He also worked with members of the Graftgold team. More recently, he was the lead artist working for the now-defunct Monkeytropolis.

Recognition
Crow was elected "Best Programmer Of The Year" in 1986 by the readers of CRASH. He was also voted best programmer of the year at the 1985 Golden Joystick Awards.

Games

ZX Spectrum
 Laser Snaker (1983), Poppy Soft
 Factory Breakout (1984), Poppy Soft
 Wizard's Lair (1985), Bubble Bus Software
 Starquake (1985), Bubble Bus Software
 Firelord (1986), Hewson
 Uridium (1986), Hewson
 Uridium+ (1987), Hewson
 Zynaps (1987), Hewson
 Eliminator (1988), Hewson
 Heavy Metal (1990), US Gold

Commodore 64
 Marauder (1988), Hewson
 Turbo Outrun (1989), U.S. Gold
 Savage (1989), Firebird Software
 Mr. Heli (1989), Firebird Software
 Golden Axe (1990), Virgin Games
 Chase H.Q. II: Special Criminal Investigation (1990), Ocean Software

Other platforms
 Global Gladiators (1993), Virgin Games
 Disney's Aladdin (1993), Sega Enterprises
 Cool Spot (1993), Virgin Games
 Walt Disney's The Jungle Book (1994), Virgin Interactive Entertainment
 Earthworm Jim (1994), Playmates Interactive
 Earthworm Jim Special Edition (1995), Interplay Entertainment
 Earthworm Jim 2 (1995), Playmates Interactive
 Skullmonkeys (1998), Electronic Arts
 BoomBots (1999), SouthPeak Games
 Metal Arms: Glitch in the System (2003), Sierra Entertainment, Vivendi Universal Games
 World of Warcraft: The Burning Crusade (2007), Blizzard Entertainment

References

 Softgraphy at SpectrumComputing.co.uk

Golden Joystick Award winners
Living people
Video game programmers
Year of birth missing (living people)